Tomislav Knez (born 9 June 1938 in Banja Luka) is a former footballer from Yugoslavia. He was part of the Yugoslav squad that won gold at the 1960 Summer Olympics.

During his club career he played for Borac Banja Luka, NK Dinamo Zagreb, SV Schwechat, SK Rapid Wien, Kapfenberger SV and SV Güssing. He earned 14 caps for the Yugoslavia national football team, and participated in the 1960 European Nations' Cup.

References

External links
 Profile at reprezentacija.rs

1938 births
Living people
Yugoslav footballers
Yugoslavia international footballers
1960 European Nations' Cup players
FK Borac Banja Luka players
GNK Dinamo Zagreb players
SK Rapid Wien players
Olympic footballers of Yugoslavia
Footballers at the 1960 Summer Olympics
Olympic gold medalists for Yugoslavia
Association football forwards
Kapfenberger SV players
Olympic medalists in football
Expatriate footballers in Austria
Austrian Football Bundesliga players
Yugoslav First League players
Sportspeople from Banja Luka

Medalists at the 1960 Summer Olympics